The Indian state of Mizoram is divided into 11 districts.

History
When Mizoram became a union territory on 21 January 1972, it was divided into three districts: Aizawl, Lunglei and Chhimtuipui. Later five more districts were carved out of the already existing three districts.

Administrative structure
A district of Mizoram is headed by a Deputy Commissioner who is in charge of the administration in that particular district. He has to perform triple functions as he holds three positions as the deputy commissioner, the district magistrate and the district collector. As a deputy commissioner he is the executive head of the district. The district magistrate is responsible for maintaining the law and order situation in the district. As the collector he is the chief revenue officer responsible for revenue collection and recovery.

A superintendent of police controls the police administration of each district.

A district is divided into one or more subdivisions, further divided into tehsils and blocks.

Districts

Notes:
The Government of Mizoram had ordered creation of offices of the Deputy Commissioners of Hnahthial, Saitual and Khawzawl Districts vide a notification dated 3 June 2019, after which the three Districts started becoming operational.

 Hnahthial, from Lunglei district
 Khawzawl, from Champhai district
 Saitual, from Aizawl district and Champhai district

Proposed districts
 Chawngte, from Lawngtlai district (Area under Chakma Autonomous District Council)
 Sangau, from Lawngtlai district (Area part of Lai Autonomous District Council)
 Sinlung Hills, from Kolasib district and Aizawl district (Area under proposed Sinlung Hills Autonomous District Council)
 Tlabung, from Lunglei district

References

External links
 https://web.archive.org/web/20110228150931/http://www.mizoram.gov.in/district/
 http://www.mizoramtourism.org/
 https://dipr.mizoram.gov.in/post/hnahthial-district-celebrates-formation/

 
Mizoram-related lists
Mizoram